Anisoptera is a genus of plants in the family Dipterocarpaceae. The name Anisoptera is derived from Greek ( = “unequal” and  = “wing”) and describes the unequal fruit calyx lobes. It contains ten species distributed from Chittagong (Bangladesh) to New Guinea. Eight out of the ten species are currently listed on the IUCN redlist. Of these, four species are listed as critically endangered and the other four as endangered. The main threat is habitat loss. The timber is a light hardwood.

Species
The Plant List includes:
 Anisoptera aurea 
 Anisoptera costata 
 Anisoptera curtisii 
 Anisoptera grossivenia 
 Anisoptera laevis 
 Anisoptera marginata 
 Anisoptera megistocarpa 
 Anisoptera reticulata 
 Anisoptera scaphula 
 Anisoptera thurifera  (Synonym A. brunnea Foxw.)

NB: Anisoptera parvifolia Warb. is a synonym of Hopea parvifolia (Warb.) Slooten

References

External links
 
 

 
Malvales genera